St Hilary Platform was a short-lived station in the Vale of Glamorgan in South Wales.

History
The station was one of four 'platforms' opened on the branch to cater for the new railmotor service. Like the others, St Hilary Platform had a single 40-foot platform, which was without a shelter. Passengers were confined to a fenced enclosure at the rear, which was unlocked by the train conductor when the train arrived. This layout was never altered.

Location
The station was not very conveniently situated with regards to the village which it claimed to serve. It was a considerable distance away, and passengers travelling from the station to the village had to climb a steep hill.

Closure
The station was never a successful undertaking. It closed on 12 July 1920, along with two other 'platforms'. Only Trerhyngyll and Maendy Halt (originally Trerhyngyll and Maendy Platform) survived beyond 1920 with its later 'pagoda'-style shelter still standing in 1959 well after closure to passenger traffic in 1951.

Notes

References
 

Disused railway stations in the Vale of Glamorgan
Railway stations in Great Britain closed in 1920
Railway stations in Great Britain opened in 1905
Former Taff Vale Railway stations